Darcy Thompson, is an Australian Paralympic cyclist with cerebral palsy. He won silver and bronze medals at the 2017 UCI Para-cycling Track World Championships in Los Angeles, United States.

Personal

Thompson was born with cerebral palsy, which affects all four of his limbs as well as his speech. He attended Prince Alfred College in Adelaide.

Cycling
Prior to taking up cycling, from 2009 to 2013 he was a member of the South Australian 7 a-side Paralympic Football team. He took up cycling in 2013.

At the 2016 UCI Para-cycling Track World Championships in Montichiari, Italy, he finished fifth in Men's 1 km Time Trial C1 and tenth in the Men's 3 km Individual Pursuit C1.

Thompson won silver medal in the Men's 1 km Time Trial C1 and bronze medal in the Men's 3 km Individual Pursuit C1 at the 2017 UCI Para-cycling Track World Championships in Los Angeles, United States

At the 2017 UCI Para-cycling Road World Championships, Pietermaritzburg, South Africa, he finished seventh in the Men's Time Trial C1 and seventh in the Men's Road Race C1-3.

At the 2019 UCI Para-cycling Track World Championships in Apeldoorn, Netherlands, he won the bronze medal in the Men's Scratch Race C1.

In 2017, he is a scholarship holder at the South Australian Sports Institute.

References

External links
Australian Cycling Team Profile

Paralympic cyclists of Australia
Cerebral Palsy category Paralympic competitors
Cyclists with cerebral palsy
Cyclists from South Australia
1997 births
Living people
Australian male cyclists